Seelampur Assembly constituency is a Delhi Legislative Assembly constituency in Delhi. It is a part of the North East Delhi Lok Sabha constituency. Seelampur was established to relocate a population displaced following the demolition of their homes in North and Central Delhi during the Emergency (India).

Members of Legislative Assembly

Election results

2020

2015

2013

2008

2003

1998

1993

References

Assembly constituencies of Delhi
Delhi Legislative Assembly